The Hyundai Custo is a 5-door minivan manufactured by Hyundai through its Beijing Hyundai joint venture in China since 2021. The vehicle was named after a French explorer and inventor, Jacques Cousteau. It shares design features with the Hyundai Tucson. It is marketed as the Hyundai Custin in Taiwan since September 2022.

Overview

The Custo is a seven-seater vehicle with a 2+2+3 interior configuration with captain's chairs for the second row. For the digital features, the Hyundai Custo adopts a floating center console and a 10.4-inch touchscreen arranged in a portrait mode and surrounded by a few touch-sensitive shortcut buttons.

Powertrain
The Hyundai Custo is powered by a turbocharged 1.5-liter engine making  or a turbocharged 2.0-liter engine making . Both engines are paired with an eight-speed automatic.

References 

Custo
Cars introduced in 2021
Minivans
Front-wheel-drive vehicles